Hayward Allen "Sandy" Sanford (June 15, 1916 – March 25, 2000) was an American football player and coach.  He played professionally as an end in the National Football League (NFL) for the Washington Redskins.  Sanford played college football at the University of Alabama.  He was recruited by Bear Bryant, an assistant at Alabama at the time.  He was also a kicker and won two games by kicking field goals for the Crimson Tide during the 1937 season that put them in the 1938 Rose Bowl.  Sanford left the NFL after one season to join the United States Navy and served as an officer during World War II.  He was the head football coach at Tarleton State University from 1951 to 1960.

References

External links
 

1916 births
2000 deaths
American football ends
American football placekickers
Alabama Crimson Tide football players
North Carolina Pre-Flight Cloudbusters football players
Saint Mary's Pre-Flight Air Devils football players
Tarleton State Texans football coaches
Washington Redskins players
United States Navy personnel of World War II
United States Navy officers
People from Yell County, Arkansas
Players of American football from Arkansas